CIDA may stand for:

 Center for Innovative Design & Analysis, a unit of the Colorado School of Public Health
 Canadian International Development Agency, a defunct department of the Government of Canada
 Community & Individual Development Association
 CIDA City Campus
 Centro de Investigaciones de Astronomia, Venezuelan institute of astronomical investigation
 Council for Interior Design Accreditation, a higher education accreditation organization
 Certificate in Digital Applications, an ICT qualification
 Critical Infrastructure Defence Act